hRecipe is a draft microformat for publishing details of recipes using (X)HTML on web pages, using HTML classes and rel attributes. In its simplest form, it can be used to identify individual foodstuffs, because the only required properties are fn ("formatted name") and an ingredient, which can be the same:

<span class="hrecipe"><span class="fn ingredient">sugar</span></span>

See also
 hAtom
 hCard
 hCalendar
 hReview
 Span and div

References

External links

 hRecipe at the Microformats Wiki

Microformats